Mike Patto (born Michael Thomas McCarthy, 22 September 1942 – 4 March 1979) was an English musician, who was primarily notable as lead singer for Spooky Tooth, Patto and Boxer.

Life and career
Patto was born in Cirencester, England, and first became vocalist and frontman for The Bo Street Runners, who won a TV band competition Ready Steady Win during 1964. He was a member of Timebox, his own band Patto, and Dick and the Firemen. In 1974, Patto joined Spooky Tooth as vocalist and keyboard player. He was also a founding member of the rock band Boxer.

Patto died of lymphatic leukemia at the age of 36. Jim Capaldi wrote the song "Bright Fighter" about him. His son (Mike McCarthy) is also a musician

References

External links
 Bo Street Runners story

1942 births
1979 deaths
People from Cirencester
English songwriters
English male singers
Deaths from throat cancer
Musicians from Gloucestershire
Deaths from cancer in England
20th-century English singers
Spooky Tooth members
Centipede (band) members
20th-century British male singers
British male songwriters